Sedin Torlak (born 12 January 1985) is a Bosnian football manager and retired professional footballer who played as a centre-back. He was most recently a coach at the FK Sarajevo U15 team.

International career
Torlak made one appearance for Bosnia and Herzegovina, in a December 2010 friendly match against Poland, coming on as a second half substitute for Josip Barišić.

Managerial statistics

Honours

Player

Individual
Awards
Sarajevo Ismir Pintol trophy: 2010–11, 2012–13

References

External links

1985 births
Living people
Footballers from Sarajevo
Association football central defenders
Bosnia and Herzegovina footballers
Bosnia and Herzegovina international footballers
NK SAŠK Napredak players
FK Sarajevo players
Sanat Mes Kerman F.C. players
FK Olimpik players
First League of the Federation of Bosnia and Herzegovina players
Premier League of Bosnia and Herzegovina players
Persian Gulf Pro League players
Bosnia and Herzegovina expatriate footballers
Expatriate footballers in Iran
Bosnia and Herzegovina expatriate sportspeople in Iran
Bosnia and Herzegovina football managers